Calgary-Egmont was a provincial electoral district in Calgary, Alberta, Canada, mandated to return a single member to the Legislative Assembly of Alberta using the first past the post method of voting from 1971 to 2012.

History

Boundary history
The district, covering southeast Calgary, was created in 1971 boundary re-distribution out of most of the Calgary South and Calgary Glenmore districts. The riding covered the neighborhoods of Riverbend, Acadia, Fairview, Willowpark, Mapleridge and Ramsay, Kingsland and Manchester. The riding included a large swath of industrial land including the Highfield Industrial area.

The district was named after Frederick George Moore Perceval, 11th Earl of Egmont who lived in the Calgary area until his death in 2001. His family had at one time 600 acres of ranch land in south Calgary.

Calgary-Egmont was a stronghold for electing Progressive Conservative candidates since its creation in 1971.  The district elected four PC representatives over the course of its history.

The Calgary-Egmont electoral district would be dissolved in the 2010 Alberta boundary re-distribution and would be re-distributed into the Calgary-Acadia electoral district.

Representation history

The electoral district was created in the 1971 boundary re-distribution. The first election held that year saw a hotly contested battle between Progressive Conservative candidate Merv Leitch and Social Credit candidate Pat O'Byrne. Leitch edged out O'Byrne to pick up the new district for his party.

Premier Peter Lougheed appointed Leitch to his first cabinet shortly after the election. He ran for a second term in the 1975 general election and won with a super majority of over 75%. He was re-elected to his third and final term in the 1979 general election. Leitch retired his seat in the legislature and from cabinet at dissolution in 1982.

The second representative of the district was Calgary-Millican MLA David Carter who switched districts in the 1982 general election. Carter won the district handily taking over 75% of the vote. He won his second term in the district and third term in the assembly in the 1986 general election. Carter was elected Speaker of the House afterwards. He won re-election the 1989 general election with a reduced majority and retired from the assembly at dissolution in 1993.

Progressive Conservative candidate Denis Herard became the districts third representative when he won in 1993. He faced a strong challenge from Liberal candidate Dick Nichols who polled the strongest non Progressive Conservative vote since 1971. Herard was re-elected three more times winning in 1997, 2001 and 2004. He was appointed to the cabinet briefly in 2006 and retired from office in 2008.

The last representative was Jonathan Denis who won the district for the first time in the 2008 general election after facing a hotly contested and controversial nomination battle against Craig Chandler.

Election results

1971 general election

1975 general election

1979 general election

1982 general election

1986 general election

1989 general election

1993 general election

1997 general election

2001 general election

2004 general election

2008 general election

Senate election results

2004 Senate nominee election district results

Voters had the option of selecting 4 Candidates on the Ballot

Alberta Student Vote 2004

On November 19, 2004 a Student Vote was conducted at participating Alberta schools to parallel the 2004 Alberta general election results. The vote was designed to educate students and simulate the electoral process for persons who have not yet reached the legal majority. The vote was conducted in 80 of the 83 provincial electoral districts with students voting for actual election candidates. Schools with a large student body that reside in another electoral district had the option to vote for candidates outside of the electoral district then where they were physically located.

See also
List of Alberta provincial electoral districts

References

Further reading

External links
Elections Alberta
The Legislative Assembly of Alberta
Electoral Divisions Act, SA 2003, c E-4.1 on CanLII
Demographics for Calgary-Egmont
Riding Map for Calgary-Egmont

Former provincial electoral districts of Alberta
Politics of Calgary